Konstantin Yakovlevich Vanshenkin (17 December 1925 – 15 December 2012; born Konstantin Weinschenker) was a Soviet poet and lyricist from Moscow.

During the Second World War Vanshenkin served in the Soviet Army at the Airborne Forces of the 2nd Ukrainian Front and the 3rd Ukrainian Front. He was enlisted in 1942 and discharged at 1946. Song about the Guards, his first collection of poetry, was published in 1951. His best known songs are "Alyosha" (1966), inspired by a military memorial in Plovdiv, and "Ya lyublyu tebya zhizn" (1956), a signature song of Mark Bernes. A collection of his songs with music was published in 1965.

Vanshenkin was a recipient of prestigious state awards, including the USSR State Prize (1985) and the State Prize of the Russian Federation (2001).

His wife  (1928–1991) was a notable lyricist in her own right. The spouses are buried at the Vagankovo Cemetery.

References

External links
 К. Ваншенкин на Стихии
 Стихи К. Ваншенкина в Антологии русской поэзии

1925 births
2012 deaths
20th-century Russian male writers
20th-century Russian poets
Communist Party of the Soviet Union members
Recipients of the Order "For Merit to the Fatherland", 4th class
Recipients of the Order of Friendship of Peoples
Recipients of the Order of the Red Banner of Labour
Recipients of the USSR State Prize
State Prize of the Russian Federation laureates
Personnel of the Soviet Airborne Forces
Socialist realism writers
Russian lyricists
Russian male poets
Russian male writers
Russian songwriters
Soviet male poets
Soviet military personnel of World War II
Soviet songwriters

Burials at Vagankovo Cemetery
Maxim Gorky Literature Institute alumni